The Massa River (Berber: ⴰⵙⵉⴼ ⵏ ⵎⴰⵙⵙⵜ) is a river in southern Morocco located in the Sous region. It originates in the Anti-Atlas and flows northwest ending in the Atlantic Ocean at the Souss-Massa National Park.

Yusuf Ibn Tashfin Dam

Constructed in 1972, the Yusuf Ibn Tashfin dam is the main dam on the Massa river.

See also
 Northern bald ibis
 Souss-Massa National Park
 Chtouka Ait Baha

References

Rivers of Morocco
Geography of Souss-Massa